Yirrkala maculata is an eel in the family Ophichthidae (worm/snake eels). It was described by Wolfgang Klausewitz in 1964, originally under the genus Caecula. It is a marine, tropical eel which is known from the western central Pacific Ocean.

References

Ophichthidae
Taxa named by Wolfgang Klausewitz
Fish described in 1964